Duisburg-Rahm station is a station in the suburb of Rahm of the city of Duisburg in the German state of North Rhine-Westphalia. It is on the Cologne–Duisburg railway and it is classified by Deutsche Bahn as a category 5 station. The station was opened on 30 September 1973.

The station is served by Rhine-Ruhr S-Bahn line S 1 (Dortmund–Solingen) every 30 minutes during the day on week days between Essen and Düsseldorf.

It is also served by bus route 728, operated by Rheinbahn with 11 services a day, and by bus route 940, operated by Duisburger Verkehrsgesellschaft at 30-minute intervals.

References

Rhine-Ruhr S-Bahn stations
S1 (Rhine-Ruhr S-Bahn)
Buildings and structures in Duisburg
Railway stations in Germany opened in 1973